"Where Do We Go from Here?" is a song from the American rock band Chicago's second studio album, Chicago (1970). It was released as the B-side of the single "25 or 6 to 4", likewise taken from Chicago; that single went to number four on the Pop Singles chart in June 1970.

The song was also the very first musical composition from bassist Peter Cetera, who was by this time contributing more than on the debut album released the year before. The song deals with how life is short, and that if you look around you can see that people need to embrace each other with love all the time, and not just when the country is at an all-time low (hence the Vietnam War). The title line is taken from a TV reporter's comment during the broadcast of the 1969 Moon landing—widely seen as a historically positive event in stark contrast to the social upheaval of the time.

A live performance of the song can be found on their 1971 Chicago at Carnegie Hall album.

Personnel 
 Peter Cetera – lead vocals, bass
 Robert Lamm – piano, backing vocals
 Terry Kath – acoustic guitar, backing vocals
 Danny Seraphine – drums

Notes

References 

Chicago (band) songs
Songs written by Peter Cetera
1970 singles
Songs of the Vietnam War
Columbia Records singles